The 2007–08 Austrian Football Bundesliga was the 96th season of top-tier football in Austria. The competition is officially called T-Mobile Bundesliga, named after the Austrian branch of German mobile phone company T-Mobile. The season started on 8 July 2007, and the 36th and last round of matches took place on 26 April 2008.

League table

Results
Teams played each other four times in the league. In the first half of the season each team played every other team twice (home and away), and then did the same in the second half of the season.

First half of season

Second half of season

Top goalscorers

Top assist providers 

 Steffen Hofmann was the assist leader of the league, having provided a total of 25 assists (both Austrian and European record).

External links
 Bundesliga website 
 OEFB  
 Soccerway 

Austrian Football Bundesliga seasons
Austria
1